New Jersey's 6th congressional district is represented by Democrat Frank Pallone, who has served the district in Congress since 1993. The district includes the northern and eastern portions of Middlesex County and the coastal areas of Monmouth County, including towns along the Raritan Bay.

Under the 2020 census map, the 6th district will remain very similar to its prior configuration. Notably, it will gain the liberal-leaning Neptune Township, Neptune City, and Red Bank, while losing the more conservative Marlboro Township, among other minor changes. According to estimates from The Cook Political Report, the district will become slightly more Democratic.

Counties and municipalities in the district
For the 118th and successive Congresses (based on redistricting following the 2020 Census), the district contains all or portions of two counties and 38 municipalities.

Middlesex County: (12)
Carteret, Edison Township, Highland Park, Metuchen, New Brunswick, Old Bridge Township (part; also 12th), Perth Amboy, Piscataway Township, Sayreville, South Amboy, South Plainfield and Woodbridge Township

Monmouth County: (26)
Aberdeen Township, Allenhurst, Asbury Park, Atlantic Highlands, Bradley Beach, Deal, Fairhaven, Hazlet Township, Highlands, Interlaken, Keansburg, Keyport, Little Silver, Loch Arbour, Long Branch, Matawan, Middletown Township (part; also 4th), Monmouth Beach, Neptune City, Neptune Township, Oceanport, Red Bank, Rumson, Sea Bright, Union Beach and West Long Branch

Recent results in statewide elections

List of members representing the district

Recent election results

2012

2014

2016

2018

2020

2022

References

 Congressional Biographical Directory of the United States 1774–present

06
Middlesex County, New Jersey
Monmouth County, New Jersey
Constituencies established in 1873
1873 establishments in New Jersey